Nanakmatta is a historical town named after the Sikh pilgrimage site, Gurdwara Nanak Mata Sahib, in the state of Uttarakhand in India. Sikh tradition records that the site was once called Gorakhmata, a centre of Siddh-jogis named after the founder of their order, Gorakhnath, at the distance of 30 miles from Reetha sahib. In the Siddh-Gost in Guru Granth Sahib, the story of Guru Nanak on his first udasi is told, wherein he had a long discourse with siddhas on matters of religion and metaphysics. Tradition says that the place was renamed Nanakmatta to perpetuate the memory of Guru's visit. The town is associated with Guru Nanak Dev and Guru Hargobind. It is situated on the bank of Deoha stream, which has since been dammed into a reservoir named Nanak Sagar. The Gurudwara is located 15 kilometres west of Khatima Railway Station on road to Tanakpur. The holy shrine is near the town of Sitarganj. It is one of three Sikh Holy places in the state, with others being Gurdwara Hemkunt Sahib and Gurudwara Reetha Sahib.

It is also an Uttarakhand Legislative Assembly constituency within the Nainital-Udhamsingh Nagar (Lok Sabha constituency).

Karsewa at Gurudwara 
Before 1937, the gurudwara was maintained by mahants. A small gurudwara was constructed by the local people. The land for the Gurudwara was donated by Nawab Mehndi Ali Khan. Karsewa began in 1975. The gurudwara building has marble all over. The complex consists of the main hall, the langar hall, the parikarama, the sarai, offices, etc. A second gurudwara, Gurudwara Patshahi Sixth, is also present here. The pipal tree under which Guru Nanak Dev sat can also be seen between the main building and Gurudwara Patshahi Chhevi.

About 140 km from this shrine is another famous spot called Gurudwara Reetha Sahib. When Guru Nanak along with companion Mardana visited this place, he took rest under a Soapnut (Reetha) tree.

References

External links
 Official website
 Google map of the area

Sikh places
Cities and towns in Udham Singh Nagar district